The 1982 Men's World Weightlifting Championships were held in Hala Tivoli, Ljubljana, SR Slovenia, SFR Yugoslavia from September 18 to September 26, 1982. There were 205 men in action from 38 nations. These world championships were combined with European championships.

Medal summary

Medal table
Ranking by Big (Total result) medals 

Ranking by all medals: Big (Total result) and Small (Snatch and Clean & Jerk)

Team ranking

References
Results (Sport 123)
Weightlifting World Championships Seniors Statistics

External links
International Weightlifting Federation

World Weightlifting Championships
World Weightlifting Championships
International weightlifting competitions hosted by Yugoslavia
World Weightlifting Championships
Weightlifting in Slovenia